The 2017–18 Belarusian Extraliga season was the 26th season of the Belarusian Extraliga, the top level of ice hockey in Belarus. Twelve teams participated in the league, and Neman Grodno won the championship.

First round

Second round

Group A

Group B

Playoffs

References

External links 
Official site

bel
Belarusian Extraleague seasons
Extraleague